Мой HiT Выпуск #1 (My HiT Volume #1) is a compilation album of songs performed by Kazakh singers and musical artists, plus two bonus tracks from Danish singer N'Evergreen. The album includes tracks composed in the English, Russian and Kazakh languages.

Track listing
 Айналайын by Qaraqat
 The Meaning Of Your Life by ORDA
 Аққу by Rakhat Turlykhanov
 Золотая Пора by Almas Kishkenbayev
 Қыздар-ай by NN Bek
 Детство by Asylbek Engsepov
 Медея by Berkut
 Кім Кінәлі by Baqay
 Разлука by 101
 Қайран Көңіл-ай by Batyrkhan Shukenov
 Я Люблю Тебя by JCS
 Жалт Етіп Өткен by Asem
 Анаға Сәлем by MuzART
 Была Ли Любовь? by Makpal Isabekova
 Махаббат Жалыны by Madina Sadvaqasova
 Не Говори by Roona
 Since You've Been Gone by N'Evergreen
 Just Another Love Song by N'Evergreen and Polina Grifis

See also
Music of Kazakhstan

Pop albums by Kazakhstani artists
2005 greatest hits albums